Nicholson Peninsula is a broad ice-covered peninsula about 15 nautical miles (28 km) long, between Couzens Bay and Matterson Inlet on the west side of Ross Ice Shelf. Named by Advisory Committee on Antarctic Names (US-ACAN) for Captain M.W. Nicholson, U.S. Navy, chief of staff to the U.S. Antarctic Projects Officer during Operation Deepfreeze 1964.

Peninsulas of Antarctica
Landforms of the Ross Dependency
Shackleton Coast